Gyeonggi Province is the most populous province in South Korea. Its name, Gyeonggi, means "京 (the capital) and 畿 (the surrounding area)". Thus, Gyeonggi-do can be translated as "Seoul and the surrounding areas of Seoul". Seoul, the nation's largest city and capital, is in the heart of the area but has been separately administered as a provincial-level special city since 1946. Incheon, the nation's third-largest city, is on the coast of the province and has been similarly administered as a provincial-level metropolitan city since 1981. The three jurisdictions are collectively referred to as Sudogwon and cover , with a combined population of over 26 million - amounting to over half (50.25%) of the entire population of South Korea at the 2020 Census.

History
Gyeonggi-do has been a politically important area since 18 BCE, when Korea was divided into three nations during the Three Kingdoms period. Ever since King Onjo, the founder of Baekje (one of the three kingdoms), founded the government in Wiryeseong of Hanam, the Han River Valley was absorbed into Goguryeo in the mid-fifth century, and became Silla's territory in the year 553 (the 14th year of King Jinheung). Afterward, the current location of Gyeonggi-do, one of the nine states of Later Silla, was called Hansanju.

The Gyeonggi region started to rise as the central region of Goryeo as King Taejo of Goryeo (the kingdom following Silla) set up the capital in Gaesong. Since 1018 (the 9th year of Goryeo's King Hyeonjong), this area has been officially called "Gyeonggi".

During the Joseon, which was founded after the Goryeo, King Taejo of Joseon set the capital in Hanyang, while restructuring Gyeonggi's area to include Gwangju, Suwon, Yeoju, and Anseong, along with the southeast region. Since the period of King Taejong and Sejong the Great, the Gyeonggi region has been very similar to the current administrative area of Gyeonggi-do.

In 1895 the 23-Bu system, which reorganized administrative areas, was effected. The Gyeonggi region was divided into Hanseong (modern Seoul;  Hanseong-bu; 한성부; 漢城府), Incheon (Incheon-bu; 인천부; 仁川府), Chungju (Chungju-bu; 충주부; 忠州府), Gongju (Gongju-bu; 공주부; 公州府), and Kaesong (Kaesong-bu; 개성부; 開城府).

During the Japanese colonial period, Hanseong-bu was incorporated into Gyeonggi-do. On October 1, 1910, it was renamed Keijo and a provincial government was placed in Keijo according to the reorganization of administrative districts.

After liberation and the foundation of two separate Korean states, Gyeonggi-do and its capital, Seoul, were separated with partial regions of Gyeonggi-do being incorporated into Seoul thereafter in 1946. Additionally, Kaesong became North Korean territory, the only city to change control after the countries were divided at the 38th parallel, which is now part of North Korea's North Hwanghae Province.

In 1967 the seat of the Gyeonggi provincial government was transferred from Seoul to Suwon. After Incheon separated from Gyeonggi-do in 1981, Gyeonggi regions such as Ongjin County and Ganghwa County were incorporated into Incheon in 1995.

Geography
Gyeonggi Province is in the western central region of the Korean Peninsula, which is vertically situated in Northeast Asia and is between east longitude of 126 and 127, and north latitude of 36 and 38. Its dimension is 10% of Korea's territory, . Its provincial government is in Suwon, but some of its government buildings are in Uijeongbu for the administrative conveniences of the northern region.

Climate
The climate of Gyeonggi-do is the continental climate, which has a severe differentiation of temperature between summer and winter, and has distinctions of four seasons. Spring is warm, summer is hot and humid, autumn is cool, and winter is cold and snowy. It becomes colder and higher in temperature differentiation from coastal to inland areas. Summer has a lower local differentiation compared to winter. The inland areas are hotter than the Gyeonggi Bay area, the hottest area is Pyeongtaek, making the average temperature of August .

It is rainy in summer and dry during winter.

Nature and national parks
The topography of Gyeonggi-do is divided into southern and northern areas by the Han River, which flows from east to west. The area north to the Han River is mainly mountainous, while the southern area is mainly plain.

The configuration of Gyeonggi-do is represented by Dong-go-seo-jeo (high in the east and low in the west), where the Gwangju Mountain Range and the Charyeong Mountain Range spreads from the east and drops in elevation in the west. The fields of Gimpo, Gyeonggi, and Pyeongtaek extend to the west.

Gyeonggi-do natural environment includes its rivers, lakes, mountains, and seas. Its representative rivers are the Hangang, Imjingang, and Anseongcheon 
Fg(Stream), which flow into the Yellow Sea, with Gyeonggi Plain, Yeonbaek Plain and Anseong Plain forming a fertile field area around the rivers. The Gwangju Mountain Range and the Charyeong Mountain Range stretch toward China in Gyeonggi Province. Most of the mountains that rise above , such as Myeongjisan, Gukmangbong and Yongmunsan in the Gwangju Mountain Range. It iriidc
Ktihas a developed granite area which, due to the granite's exfoliation effect, makes it full of strangely shaped cliffs and deep valleys. The Charyeong Mountain Range forms the boundary between Gyeonggi-do and Chungcheongbuk-do, but is a relatively low-altitude hilly area.

In Gyeonggi-do, there is Bukhansan National Park in Uijeongbu. For provincial parks, there are the Chukryeongsan Natural Recreation Area, Namhan-sanseong Provincial Park, Gapyeong Yeoninsan Provincial Park, and Mulhyanggi Arboretum. Besides the listed, the scenery of well-known mountains including Soyosan of Dongducheon City, Yongmunsan of Yangpyeong County, and Gwanaksan of Anyang and Gwacheon, along with Hangang and Imjingang are tourist sites of Gyeonggi-do.

 Moraksan, a 385-meter rock mountain.

Population

Gyeonggi-do has shown a rapid increase in population due to the modernization and urbanization of the Republic of Korea. Its population has increased from 2,748,765 in 1960 to 3,703,761 in 1980; 6,050,943 in 1990; 8,984,134 in 2000; 11,379,459 in 2010; and 13,511,676 in 2020.

In 2010 there were 4,527,282 households, with an average of 3 people per family. There were 6,112,339 males and 5,959,545 females. The population density was 1,119 people/km2, almost double the national average of 486 people/km2.

Excluding the two metropolitan cities (Seoul and Incheon), the most heavily populated area as of 2010 is Suwon (1,104,681) followed by Goyang (1,076,179), Seongnam (996,524), Yongin (891,708), Bucheon (890,875) and Ansan (753,862). The lowest populated area in 2010 was Yeoncheon County (45,973), followed by Gapyeong County (59,916) and Yangpyeong County (72,595).

Economy
As the backbone of Seoul in the means of manufacturing complex, Gyeonggi-do is evenly developed in heavy industry (electronics, machine, heavy and chemical industry, steel), light industry (textile), and farm, livestock and fisheries industry. Due to the influence of recent high wages, the weight of manufacturing industries has decreased in Korea's economy. Gyeonggi-do is making efforts in many ways to improve and modernize the conventional industry structure, resulting in quick growth of innovative small and medium-sized enterprises such as U-JIN Tech Corp. Gyeonggi-do is unsparingly investing in the promotion of service industries related to soft competitive power such as state-of-the-art IT industry, designing, conventions and tourism, along with its great leap as a commercial hub in Northeast Asia using the Pyeongtaek Harbor.

Besides this, it is known for its special local products such as Icheon rice and Icheon/Gwangju ceramics. Leading companies representing Korea, including Samsung Electronics' headquarters, SK Hynix's headquarters, NAVER's headquarters, Samsung SDI's headquarters, and Paju LG Corporation's LCD complex, are gathered in southern Gyeonggi Province, including Suwon City.

Administrative area

Gyeonggi-do consists of 28 cities (special: 7, normal: 21) and three counties. This is because many counties were elevated to city status owing to the influence of Seoul's new town development plan. Special cities are especially concentrated in the southern area of Gyeonggi-do.

Listed below is each entity's name in English, Hangul and Hanja.

Claimed

 Gaeseong, Gaepung County and Jangdan County

Transportation
Gyeonggi-do's proximity to Seoul, South Korea's capital, and Incheon, its second-busiest port, has contributed to its extremely well-developed transportation infrastructure. It is close to both Incheon International Airport, South Korea's main international gateway and busiest airport, and Gimpo International Airport, its second-busiest airport. Use of water transportation from the harbor at Pyeongtaek is also high.

Road
The road pavement rate throughout the province averages 86.5 percent. The area has access to many of South Korea's expressways, including

 No. 1 Gyeongbu Expressway, Seoul–Busan
 No. 15 Seohaean Expressway, Seoul–Mokpo
 No. 35 Jungbu Expressway, Seoul–Tongyeong
 No. 37 Second Jungbu Expressway, Seoul–Yongin
 No. 45 Jungbu Naeryuk Expressway, Yeoju–Gimcheon
 No. 50 Yeongdong Expressway, Incheon–Gangneung
 No. 60 Seoul–Yangyang Expressway, Seoul–Chuncheon
 No. 100 Seoul Ring Expressway
 No. 110 Second Gyeongin Expressway, Incheon–Anyang
 No. 120 Gyeongin Expressway, Seoul–Incheon
 No. 130 Incheon International Airport Expressway, Incheon International Airport–Seoul

Rail
Gyeonggi-do is served by Korail commuter, standard and high-speed (KTX) services. It is home to Korea's first railroad, the Gyeongin Line, and includes portions of the Gyeongbu Line, Gyeongui Line, Jungang Line, and Honam Line. Gyeonggi has stations on the Suin, Bundang, Gyeongchun, and Shinbundang commuter rail services and the Gyeongbu and Honam High Speed Railways.

The area has numerous connections to the Seoul Metropolitan Subway system. Line 1 (formerly Korea National Railroad of Seoul) extends to Cheonan past Gyeonggi-do to the southwest, and to Dongducheon to the north. Line 3 connects to Goyang to the north, while Line 4 is connected to Gwacheon and Ansan to the southwest. Line 7 is connected to Uijeongbu to the north and Gwangmyeong to the south, while Line 8 is connected to Seongnam to the south.

Uijeongbu has its own light rail system, the U Line, which connects to Line 1.

A short section of the AREX line between Gimpo and Incheon airports passes through Gyeonggi, but there are no stops within the province.

Education
Gyeonggi-do is actively investing in education to foster a talented population suitable for the globalized economy. It is promoting the opening of local campuses of reputable universities as well as establishing special purpose high schools for high-quality education. It has also founded and operates at Paju the largest domestic "English village" for education in the English language, as well as villages in Ansan and Yangpyeong.

Universities of Gyeonggi Province(경기도)

National
Anseong City
 Hankyong National University
Private
Ansan City
 Ansan University
 Hanyang University (ERICA Campus)
 Seoul Institute of the Arts
 Shin Ansan University
Anseong City
 Chung-Ang University (Anseong Campus)
Anyang City
 Anyang University
 Sungkyul University
Bucheon City
 Seoul Theological University
Goyang City
 Korea Aerospace University
Gunpo City
 Hansei University
Gwangju City
 Seoul Jangsin University and Theological Seminary
Hwaseong City
 Hyupsung University
 Shingyeong University
Osan City
 Hanshin University
Pochon City
 College of Medicine Pochon CHA University
 Daejin University
Pyeongtaek City
 Pyongtaek University
Seongnam City
 Gachon University
Siheung City
 Korea Polytechnic University
Suwon City
 Ajou University
 Kyung Hee University
 Seoul National University (Gwanggyo Graduate School Campus)
 Sungkyungwan university (Natural Science Campus)
 Suwon Catholic University
 Suwon Science College
Uijeongbu City
 Hanbuk University
Yangpyeong County
 Asian Center for Theological Studies and Mission
Yongin City
 Calvin University
 Dankook University
 Hankuk University of Foreign Studies (Global Campus)
 Kangnam University
 Kyung Hee University (International Campus)
 Luther University
 Myongji University (Science Departments Campus)
 Yongin University

Colleges

Schools

Culture

Historical landmarks
Gyeonggi-do has long been a capital area, leaving many historic relics and ruins. For royal tombs (called reung), there are Donggureung of Guri, and Gwangreung, Hongreung and Yureung of Namyangju. For castles (called seong), there are Suwon Hwaseong, which is designated as the World Cultural Heritage, Namwonsanseong, Haengjusanseong, Ganghwasanseong, and Doksan Fortress. For Buddhist temples, there are many aged temples within Gyeonggi-do where one can experience ‘temple stay’. You can view folk culture in the Korean Folk Village in Yongin, and the scene of Korea's division at Panmunjom in Paju.

Performing arts
Gyeonggi-do is investing a lot of money at a provincial level so that people do not have to go to Seoul to enjoy a high-class cultural life. There are performances at Gyeonggi Arts Center in Suwon as well as at Gyeonggi Korean Traditional Music Center in Yongin. Gyeonggi Provincial Museum in Yongin, Nam June Paik Art Center in Yongin, Gyeonggi Museum of Art in Ansan, and the Ceramics Museum in Gwangju are some of the facilities that are currently run by the province. There are also sightseeing opportunities at Jangheung Art Park, Publication Art Complex at Heyri, Paju, and the Icheon Ceramics Exposition.

Heyri Art Valley 
Heyri Art Valley is Korea's largest art town. Various Korean artists constructed the cultural town of Heyri and it features several art galleries and museums; there are about 40 museums, exhibitions, concert halls and bookstores.

Religion 

According to the census of 2005, of the people of Gyeonggi-do 34.3% follow Christianity (21.9% Protestantism and 12.4% Catholicism) and 16.8% follow Buddhism. 51.1% of the population is mostly not religious or follow indigenous religions.

Sports

The 2002 Korea-Japan World Cup matches were held in Suwon World Cup Stadium. As for the professional soccer teams with Gyeonggi-do as their home ground, there are the Suwon Samsung Bluewings and Seongnam FC. Also, there is the professional basketball team of Guri Kdb Life Winnus, sponsored by Kdb Life Insurance.

Korea's foremost thoroughbred horse racing track Seoul Race Park is in Gwacheon.

Sailing is a high-profile sport in Gyeonggi. Gyeonggi-do's location on the bank of the river Han makes it an ideal venue for the sport which is host to the prestigious Korea Match Cup event which is a part of the World Match Racing Tour. The event draws the world's best sailing teams to Gyeonggi in a gladiatorial battle of nerve and skill on the water. The identical supplied (KM-36) boats are raced two at a time in an on the water dogfight which tests the sailors and skippers to the limits of their physical abilities. Points accrued count towards the World Match Race Tour and a place in the final event, with the overall winner taking the title ISAF World Match Racing Tour Champion. Match racing is an ideal sport for spectators in Gyeonggi. Racing in such close proximity to the river bank provides excellent heart of the action views for the audience. Highlights of the event can be seen on KBS World television and via the official World Match Racing Tour website.

Domestic sports clubs

Association football
 K League 1 (3)
 Suwon Samsung Bluewings
 Seongnam FC
 Suwon FC
 K League 2 (2)
 FC Anyang
 Bucheon FC 1995
 K3 League (5)
 Gimpo FC
 Hwaseong FC
 Paju Citizen
 Pyeongtaek Citizen
 Yangju Citizen
 K4 League (5)
 Goyang Citizen
 Pocheon Citizen
 Siheung Citizen
 Yangpyeong FC
 Yeoju FC
 WK-League (2)
 Suwon FMC
 Goyang Daekyo Noonnoppi Kangaroos

Baseball
 Korea Baseball Organization (1)
 KT Wiz

Basketball
 KBL (2)
 Anyang KGC
 Goyang Orion Orions
 WKBL (4)
 Yongin Samsung Life Blueminx
 Ansan Shinhan Bank S-Birds
 Guri KDB Life Winnus
 Bucheon KEB-Hana

Volleyball
 V-League Men (2)
 Suwon KEPCO Vixtorm
 Sangmu Shinhyup
 V-League Women (3)
 Suwon Hyundai Engineering & Construction Hillstate
 Seongnam Korea Expressway Hi-pass Zenith
 Hwaseong IBK Altos

Ice hockey
 Asia League Ice Hockey (1)
 HL Anyang

Former sports clubs

Football
 Anyang LG Cheetahs (1996–2003, Anyang → Seoul)
 Bucheon SK (1996–2005, Bucheon → Jeju)
 Bucheon FMC Best (2010, Dissolved)
 Ansan H FC
 Goyang KB Kookmin Bank
 Namyangju United

Basketball
 Suwon Samsung Thunders (1997–2001, Suwon → Seoul)
 Bucheon Shinsegae Coolcat (2006–2012, Dissolved)

Tourism

Entertainment
 Everland theme park in Yongin-si
 Korean Folk Village in Yongin-si
 Munhwa Broadcasting Corporation (MBC) Dramia at Cheoin-gu in Yongin-si; is the filming location of historical dramas such as Moon Embracing the Sun, Jumong, Queen Seondeok and Dong Yi. Viewing tours are available, which includes traditional folk games, historical court dress and archery.
 Hallyuworld theme park, which is based on the ‘Korean Fever’, is under construction in Goyang
 Seoul Grand Park in Gwacheon, which has the Korea's National Museum of Contemporary Art and a zoo * ski and golf resorts
 Icheon Hot Spring
 LetsRunPark in Gwacheon
The place is also known among KPOP fans as popular global KPOP Star Jin, member of BTS is from this province.

Gourmet
Gyeonggi-do has long been famous for its Icheon rice, Yangpyeong Korean beef, Suwon cow ribs and Korean court cuisine, and marine delicacies made of fresh marine products from the west coast.

Festival

Partition proposal

Sisterhood relations
  Utah, United States
  Aichi Prefecture, Japan
  Kanagawa Prefecture, Japan
  Liaoning, People's Republic of China
  North Holland, Netherlands
  Gauteng, South Africa
  State of Mexico, Mexico
  Virginia, United States
  Alto Paraná Department, Paraguay
  Queensland, Australia
  Catalonia, Spain
  Florida, United States
  Guangdong, People's Republic of China
  British Columbia, Canada
  Hebei, People's Republic of China
  Shandong, People's Republic of China
  Taiwan Province, Republic of China (Taiwan)

References

Notes

External links

  
  
 Invest in Gyeonggi Province – English
 Gyeonggi Tourism Guide – English
 DMZ – English
 KINTEX – English 
 Goyang City Hall

 
Provinces of South Korea
Provinces of Korea
Regions of Korea
Seoul Capital Area
Divided regions